The 2006 Eastbourne Council election took place on 4 May 2006 to elect members of Eastbourne Borough Council in East Sussex, England. One third of the council was up for election and the Conservative Party stayed in overall control of the council.

After the election, the composition of the council was:
Conservative 15
Liberal Democrats 12

Background
Before the election the Conservatives controlled the council with 14 seats compared to 13 for the Liberal Democrats, after the Conservatives took control at the 2004 election. 9 seats were contested by a total of 36 candidates, with the Conservatives, Liberal Democrats, Labour Party and Green Party contesting every seat. 2 Liberal Democrat councillors stood down at the election, Chris Berry and Beryl Healy, from Langney and Devonshire wards respectively.

A major issue at the election was parking in Eastbourne, as well as a campaign to save the local hospital from closure.

Election result
The Conservatives stayed in control of the council after gaining one seat from the Liberal Democrats. The only change came in Old Town ward, where Conservative Anne Angel gained the seat with a majority of 253, defeating Liberal Democrat Maurice Skilton, who had been a councillor for over 40 years. Meanwhile, Labour was in fourth place in every ward but one, behind the Green Party. Overall turnout at the election was 40.70%, compared to 40.97% in 2004.

Ward results

References

2006
2006 English local elections
2000s in East Sussex